Relentless Recurrence is the third studio album by the Taiwanese black metal band Chthonic, released in 2002. The album was only available in Taiwan until its re-release in 2007 by SPV with revamped packaging, including English translations.

A music video was released for the song "Onset of Tragedy" and was the band's first music video.

Track listing
English version

Chinese (traditional) version

Personnel
Chthonic
 Freddy Lim – lead vocals, erhu
 Jesse Liu – guitar, backing vocals
 Doris Yeh – bass, backing vocals
 Vivien Chen – keyboards
 A-Jay – drums

Production
 Jan Borsing – sound engineer

References

2002 albums
Chthonic (band) albums